The Southern Azerbaijan National Awakening Movement (SANAM) (GAMOH) is a Baku-based group that advocates self-determination for Azerbaijanis of Iran, and the "unification of Azerbaijanis living on both sides of the Aras River".

Foundation and mission
It was separated from (SANLM) and founded in 2002 by Mahmudali Chehregani, and claims to represent the interests of Iran's Azerbaijani minority.

At the UNPO, Iranian Azerbaijan was previously represented by Southern Azerbaijan National Awakening Movement.

See also

Azerbaijan National Resistance Organization
Human rights in Iran
Iranian Azerbaijanis
Whole Azerbaijan

References

External links

 

Political organizations based in Azerbaijan
Azerbaijani nationalism
Members of the Unrepresented Nations and Peoples Organization
Pan-Turkist organizations
Political parties of minorities in Iran
Azerbaijani irredentism